The 2019–20 Rugby Pro D2 was the second-level French rugby union club competition, behind the Top 14, for the 2019–20 season. It ran alongside the 2019–20 Top 14 competition; both competitions are operated by the Ligue Nationale de Rugby (LNR).

Playing was suspended after the 23rd Matchday due to the COVID-19 pandemic in France. The season was officially cancelled without any promotion or relegation on 6 May.

Teams

Changes in the lineup from 2018–19 were:
 Bayonne won the 2018–19 Pro D2 title and were thereby automatically promoted to the Top 14. Brive won the Top 14/Pro D2 playoff to secure the second promotion place.
 The two bottom finishers in 2018–19, Massy and Bourg-en-Bresse, were relegated from Pro D2 to Fédérale 1. 
 The bottom finisher in the 2018–19 Top 14 season, Perpignan was relegated to Pro D2. Grenoble lost the Top 14/Pro D2 playoff and were therefore relegated.
 Rouen won the 2018–19 Fédérale 1 title and were thereby automatically promoted. Valence Romans, who finished 2nd, was also promoted

Number of teams by regions

Competition format
The regular season uses a double round-robin format, in which each team plays the others home and away.

The LNR uses a slightly different bonus points system from that used in most other rugby competitions. It trialled a new system in 2007–08 explicitly designed to prevent a losing team from earning more than one bonus point in a match, a system that also made it impossible for either team to earn a bonus point in a drawn match. LNR chose to continue with this system for subsequent seasons.

France's bonus point system operates as follows:

 4 points for a win.
 2 points for a draw.
 1 bonus point for winning while scoring at least 3 more tries than the opponent. This replaces the standard bonus point for scoring 4 tries regardless of the match result.
 1 bonus point for losing by 5 points (or less). The required margin had been 7 points or less until being changed in advance of the 2014–15 season.

Starting with the 2017–18 season, Pro D2 conducts a play-off system identical to the one currently used in Top 14, with the top six teams qualifying for the play-offs and the top two teams receiving byes into the semi-finals. The winner of the play-offs earns the league championship and automatic promotion to the next season's Top 14; the runner-up enters a play-off with the second-from-bottom Top 14 team, with the winner of that play-off taking up the final place in Top 14.

This replaced the previous system in which the top team at the end of the regular season was declared champion, also earning a Top 14 place, while the second- through fifth-place teams competed in promotion play-offs. The play-off semi-finals were played at the home ground of the higher-ranked team. The final was then played on neutral ground, and the winner earned the second ticket to the next Top 14.

Promotion

Pro D2 to Top 14 
As noted above, both promotion places will be determined by play-offs from 2017–18 forward, with the winner of the Pro D2 play-offs earning promotion and the runner-up playing the second-from-bottom Top 14 team for the next season's final Top 14 place.

Fédérale 1 to Pro D2 
At the same time, LNR and the French Rugby Federation (FFR) changed the promotion process from Fédérale 1 to Pro D2. For three seasons (2017–18 to 2019–20), only one team will be promoted to Pro D2 through the Fédérale 1 competition. The second promotion place will be a "wild card" granted by LNR to a club that meets the following criteria:
 must be located in northern France (with the dividing line running approximately from La Rochelle to Lyon)
 have a long-term development plan
 location in an area that can demographically and economically support a fully professional club
Starting with the 2020–21 season, LNR will create a third professional league, slotting between Pro D2 and Fédérale 1 in the league system.

Relegation
Normally, the teams that finish in 15th and 16th places in the table are relegated to Fédérale 1 at the end of the season. In certain circumstances, "financial reasons" may cause a higher-placed team to be demoted instead, or bar a Fédérale 1 team from promotion.

Table

Fixtures & Results

Round 1

Round 2

Round 3

Round 4

Round 5

Postponed due to staph infection outbreak.  Rescheduled to 29 November 2019.

Postponed due to staph infection outbreak.  Rescheduled to 29 November 2019.

Round 6

Postponed due to staph infection outbreak.  Rescheduled for 14 March 2020.

Round 7

Round 8

Round 9

Round 10

Round 11

Round 12

Round 5 (rescheduled games)

Rescheduled from 27 September 2019.

Rescheduled from 27 September 2019.

Round 13

Round 14

Round 15

Round 16

Round 17

Round 18 

Postponed due to heavy flooding.  Game to be rescheduled for 14 March 2020.

Round 19

Round 20

Round 21

Round 22

Postponed due to heavy winds.  Game to be rescheduled for 21 March 2020.

Round 23

Rounds 6 & 18 (rescheduled games)

Originally rescheduled from 24 January 2020 but postponed again as French pro rugby is suspended due to Coronavirus outbreak.

Originally rescheduled from 4 October 2019 bot postponed again as French pro rugby is suspended due to Coronavirus outbreak.

Round 22 (rescheduled game)

Originally rescheduled from 1 March 2020 but postponed again as French rugby is suspended due to Coronavirus outbreak.

Round 24

All games cancelled as French rugby is suspended due to Coronavirus outbreak.

Round 25

All games cancelled as French rugby is suspended due to Coronavirus outbreak.

Round 26

All games cancelled as French rugby is suspended due to Coronavirus outbreak.

Round 27

All games cancelled as French rugby is suspended due to Coronavirus outbreak.

Round 28

All games cancelled as French rugby is suspended due to Coronavirus outbreak.

Round 29

All games cancelled as French rugby is suspended due to Coronavirus outbreak.

Round 30

All games cancelled as French rugby is suspended due to Coronavirus outbreak.

Attendances

 Attendances do not include the final as this is held at a neutral venue.  Also does not include the relegation playoff game.

Leading scorers
Note: Flags to the left of player names indicate national team as has been defined under World Rugby eligibility rules, or primary nationality for players who have not yet earned international senior caps. Players may hold one or more non-WR nationalities.

Top points scorers

Top try scorers

See also
2019–20 Top 14 season

Notes

References

External links
  Ligue Nationale de Rugby – Official website
  Midi Olympique

2019-20
2019–20 in French rugby union leagues